The 2020 New Zealand rugby league season was be the 113th season of rugby league that had been played in New Zealand. The main feature of the year will be the National Competition, run by the New Zealand Rugby League. The New Zealand Warriors also are competing in the 2020 NRL season.

Men's national competitions 
2020 will be the 11th year of the national competition, which will have a four team premiership, a four team North Island championship and a four team South Island championship.

NZRL Premiership

Ladder

Grand Final

North Island Championship

Ladder

South Island Championship

Ladder

North vs South

Women's national competitions

NZRL Women's Premiership

Ladder

Grand Final

NZRL Women's Championship

Ladder

Grand Final

References 

2020 in New Zealand rugby league